Mahaley Patel (née Hessam; born September 30, 1987) is an American actress best known for appearances in the films Easy A, The DUFF, and Our Show.

Personal life 
Patel was born in Atlanta, Georgia, as Mahaley Hessam. Her parents are Harriet and Tawab Hessam. Her father is from Afghanistan. She married Indian-American actor Ravi Patel on November 8, 2015, with whom she has a daughter named Amelie, born 2016. She owns a boxer named Coco and, in her spare time, volunteers as a youth mentor with Red Eye Inc. 

She attended high school at Laurel Springs High School and college at Emory University and then UCLA. Patel is also an honors graduate of UCLA. Patel attended UCLA where she got her first big break in Easy A.  Patel co-founded MaHolland Productions, which specializes in producing and developing socially relevant content. Patel has had the same acting coach since she was in high school and said Lisina Stoneburner is one of the first people whom she calls when she lands a role. As of 2018, Patel attends Pepperdine University, and is working on her degree that specializes in marriage and family therapy.

Filmography

Film

Television

References

External links

Living people
1987 births
American people of Afghan descent
American television actresses
American film actresses
Actresses from Atlanta
University of California, Los Angeles alumni
20th-century American actresses
21st-century American actresses